Sadaung is a village in Yamethin District in the south-central part of the Mandalay Region in Myanmar.

Notes

External links
 "Sadaung Map — Satellite Images of Sadaung" Maplandia

Populated places in Mandalay Region